Thomas Godfrey may refer to:

Thomas Godfrey (footballer) (1904–1983), Scottish footballer
Thomas Godfrey (inventor) (1704–1749), inventor of an octant
Thomas Godfrey (writer), poet and author of The Prince of Parthia, son of the inventor
Thomas J. Godfrey, legislator in the U.S. state of Ohio
Tommy Godfrey (1916–1984), English actor